Robert Kozioła (born 13 January 1981) is a former Polish footballer who played as a defender.

He started his career playing for the youth sides of GKP Gorzów Wielkopolski, joining Czarni Żagań in 1999 to start his professional career. In 2000 he joined II liga side Lechia-Polonia Gdańsk who were playing in the second division of Polish football. Kozioła failed to make a league appearance for the club during his six-month spell, but made appearances in the Polish Cup and in the Polish League Cup. Kozioła returned to Czarni Żagań for the following season before joining Promień Żary for a period of stability playing with the club for four seasons. After a short spell with Polonia Słubice he rejoined the club where his career started, GKP Gorzów Wielkopolski, going on to make appearances in the second and third Polish divisions, with the 2008–09 season being that in which he played his highest standard of football, making 7 appearances in the newly structured I liga. After the highlight of his career he spent two seasons with Pogoń Barlinek, rejoining GKP Gorzów Wielkopolski which now went by the name Stilon Gorzów Wielkopolski. Apart from a 6-month stint playing with Warta Gorzów Wielkopolski the rest of his career was spent playing with Stilon until 2016, when he retired from playing professional football.

References

1981 births
Living people
Lechia Gdańsk players
Stilon Gorzów Wielkopolski players
Czarni Żagań players
Promień Żary players
Polish footballers
Association football defenders